Rozdory is an urban-type settlement in Synelnykove Raion of Dnipropetrovsk Oblast in Ukraine. It is located on the right bank of the Nizhnia Tersa, in the basin of the Dnieper, east of the town of Synelnykove. Rozdory hosts the administration of Rozdory settlement hromada, one of the hromadas of Ukraine. Population:

Economy

Transportation
The settlement has access (via Synelnykove) to Highway M18 connecting Kharkiv with Zaporizhzhia and Melitopol and (via Pavlohrad) to Highway M04 connecting Dnipro with Pokrovsk.

Rozdori has a railway station on the railway connecting Dnipro via Synelnykove with Chaplyne; it has further connections to Pokrovsk and Berdyansk. There is infrequent passenger traffic.

References

Urban-type settlements in Synelnykove Raion